The Superleague Greece Youth Leagues is a system of youth football leagues that are managed, organised and controlled by the Superleague. Youth Leagues are the organizational events involving the superleague clubs' infrastructure teams. It was established in 2002 as a single category, and in 2008 it split into two, until 2013 to three age levels. Previously known as the "Amateur Championship".

Leagues
In each league, they participate Infrastructure teams of Superleague's clubs. A team may become a champion in any of the infrastructure championships, but not participate in the next year's championship if the first team is relegated.

History
 2001–02: First period, a single category with the teams by Alpha Ethniki championship, with the title "Youth Championship". It was maintained until 2005-06.
 2006–07: The Superleague takes over the championship under the title "Superleague youth Under 21".
 2008–09: The "youth" rating is removed, and the championship is called the "Superleague under 21 (U21)". A second league was created, The "Superleague under 18 (U18)".
 2009–10: The age limit in the second league dropped from 18 to 17 years, renamed "Super League U17".
 2010–11: The age limit in the first league dropped from 21 to 20 years, renamed "Super League U20".
 2013–14: The third league was created, the "Superleague Under 15 (U15)".

Superleague under 20
It takes place in a single group. Any team taking the first place at the end of the season become a champion. The schedule is common to the Superleague's championship.

Superleague under 17
It takes place in two groups, where the teams are placed with geographical criteria. The first two teams of each group qualify for the final stage, Which takes place in a court with knockout matches (semi-finals and final).

Superleague under 15
It takes place in two groups, where the teams are placed with geographical criteria. The first team of each group qualify to the final, which takes place on a neutral stadium. The winner being a champion. Participation in this category is optional.

Champions